The Lao National Union Party was a Buddhist Socialist political party in Laos.

History
The party was established by Bong Souvannavong on 22 September 1947. It won two of the 39 seats in the 1951 elections and retained both in the 1955 elections. It failed to win a seat in the 1958 supplementary elections and lost parliamentary representation following the 1960 elections.

References

Defunct political parties in Laos
Political parties established in 1947
1947 establishments in Laos
Political parties with year of disestablishment missing